Police Calling 091 (Spanish: 091 Policía al habla) is a 1960 Spanish crime film directed by José María Forqué and starring Adolfo Marsillach, Tony Leblanc and Susana Campos.

Cast

References

External links

1960 crime films
Spanish crime films
Films directed by José María Forqué
Films set in Madrid
Films scored by Augusto Algueró
1960s Spanish films